Seven Words is the sixth studio album by British thrash metal band Xentrix, and released 11 November 2022 through Listenable Records. To promote the upcoming release the band produced music videos for both the title track, "Seven Words", and "Reckless with a Smile".

Background
Guitarist Kristian Havard revealed prior that the LP is a "culmination of the last two years of experimenting and trying new ideas. It feels like a big step for the band, but without leaving our thrash metal history, and I can't wait for people to hear it."

Reception

General reception has been positive upon its release. AllAboutTheRock praised the album, loving every track. They mentioned that track after track on the album is a relentless, full-on thrash fest. Furthermore adding, "I’m beginning to think Xentrix are back to show the younger bands how thrash metal is supposed to be done. All fans of Xentrix and indeed fans of thrash metal seriously need to check this album out." In a positive review, Blabbermouth mentioned that from start to finish, Seven Words sounds authoritative and sonically dynamic, with just about the right amount of dirt under its fingernails. "Yes, XENTRIX deal in thrash metal archetypes, but with a degree of skill that belies their underdog status."

Track listing

Personnel
Xentrix 
Jay Walsh - vocals, guitars
Dennis Gasser - drums
Chris Shires - bass
Kristian "Stan" Havard - guitar

Production
Dan Goldsworthy - artwork, layout
Andy Sneap - producer, mixing, mastering

References

External links
Official music videos

Xentrix albums
2022 albums
Listenable Records albums